(The) Hunted may refer to:

Film
 Hunted (1952 film), starring Dirk Bogarde
Hunted (2020 film), a Belgian-French-Irish survival thriller film
 The Hunted (1948 film), a film noir featuring Preston Foster
 The Hunted (1995 film), directed by J. F. Lawton and starring Christopher Lambert, Joan Chen and John Lone
 The Hunted (2003 film), directed by William Friedkin and starring Tommy Lee Jones, Benicio del Toro, and Connie Nielsen
The Hunted (2013 film), directed by Josh Stewart

Literature
 The Hunted (novel) by Elmore Leonard, 1976
 Hunted (Cast novel), a fantasy novel by P.C. Cast and Kristin Cast
 Hunted (Gardner novel), a science fiction novel by James Alan Gardner
 Hunted, a novel in The Iron Druid Chronicles series by Kevin Hearne
 Hunted, a collection of novellas in the series Left Behind: The Young Trib Force by Jerry B. Jenkins and Tim LaHaye

Television 
 Hunted (2012 TV series), a British–American spy drama
 Hunted (2015 TV series), a British reality television series
 Hunted (2017 TV series), an American adaptation of the UK series
 Hunted (Australian TV series), an Australian adaptation of the UK series
 "The Hunted" (Star Trek: The Next Generation), first aired in 1990
 "Hunted" (The Walking Dead), an episode from season 11 of The Walking Dead
 "Hunted", an episode from season 2 of Supernatural
 "Hunted", an episode from season 3 of Teenage Mutant Ninja Turtles (2003 TV series)
 "Hunted", an episode of The Twilight Zone (2002 TV series)
Ninjago: Hunted, the ninth season in the Ninjago: Masters of Spinjitzu computer-animated television series

Other uses 
 Hunted (album), a 2016 LP by Khemmis
 The Hunted (web series), created by Robert Chapin
 Hunted: The Demon's Forge, a 2011 video game
 "The Hunted" (song), a 2019 song by Saint Asonia

See also
 Hunt (disambiguation)
 The Hunt (disambiguation)
 Hunter (disambiguation)
 Hunting (disambiguation)